Jesus Marino "Rene" Gandiongco Espina (December 26, 1929 – September 13, 2019) was a Filipino lawyer, legislator, and politician. He served as Governor of the province of Cebu, Philippines (1963–1969) and Senator (1970–1973).

Early life 
Rene Espina was born to Rafael Espina and Tarcela Gandiongco in Cebu City, Cebu on 26 December 1929. He earned his law degree from the University of Southern Philippines and was one of the top passers from the bar exams when he became lawyer on 22 January 1955. The family's old house was located along Gervasio Lavilles Street, Cebu City. His marriage to Rufinita de Leon Remollo from Negros Oriental bore three children, including Rene Mari, Jean Franco, and Cebu City councilor Erik Miguel Espina, who was appointed by Rodrigo Duterte to replace dismissed councilor James Anthony Cuenco.

Career 
Espina was appointed Social Security System chair by then President Diosdado Macapagal from 1962 to 1963.

Governor of Cebu 
He received the endorsement of Macapagal as the official candidate for governor of the Liberal Party on 9 September 1963. On 12 November 1963, he defeated incumbent governor Francisco "Kikoy" Remotigue of the Nacionalista Party by over 73,000 votes and was elected Governor of Cebu. Priscillano Almendras was voted Vice Governor and the members of the Provincial Board were Nazario Pacquiao, Salutario Fernandez and Isidro Escario. Espina switched to Nacionalista Party during his campaign for reelection as governor in 1967, and won over Priscillano Almendras of the Liberal Party.

Cabinet member 
Then President Ferdinand Marcos appointed him as Secretary of the Public Works, Transportation, and Communication on November 1968, serving as both governor and member of the Cabinet. It was during this time that the plans for the Mactan Bridge were initiated, and Espina oversaw the completion of its construction when he became part of the advisers of Marcos after Congress was dissolved on the establishment of martial law in the country in 1972.

Senator 
He resigned from the Cabinet post to run for the Senate under the Nacionalista Party in September 1969, and he was succeeded by Antonio Syquio. On 11 November 1969, he was voted Senator of the 7th Congress and served from 1970 to 1973. He crafted the country's first anti-drug law, Republic Act 6425 otherwise known as the Dangerous Drugs Act of 1972.

During the 1978 election for the Iinterim Batasang Pambansa, he was one of the 13 candidates together with Eduardo Gullas, Ramon Durano III, Tito Calderon, Emilio Osmeña and Antonio Cuenco for the Marcos-backed political party Kilusang Bagong Lipunan (KBL) to represent Region VII. However, none of them were elected and instead, all 13 candidates from the local political party, Pusyon Bisaya that included Natalio Bacalso and which received widespread support, were voted to represent all seats for the region.

Later years 
Espina was a columnist for Manila Bulletin.

On 11 April 2019, 110 farmers were installed as agrarian reform beneficiaries by the Department of Agrarian Reform (DAR) on the 150-hectare land owned by Espina in Polo, Tanjay City, Negros Oriental.

Death 
Governor Espina died on September 13, 2019 at a private hospital in Cebu City due to an untreated infection brought about by dialysis. He was already undergoing dialysis thrice a week due to his previous untreated pneumonia that affected his kidneys. He was 89 years of age.

References 

1929 births
2019 deaths
20th-century Filipino lawyers
Senators of the 7th Congress of the Philippines
Governors of Cebu
Ferdinand Marcos administration cabinet members
Visayan people
Cebuano people
Secretaries of Public Works and Highways of the Philippines